Juma Nature a.k.a. Sir Nature (born Juma Kassim Ally, in 1980) is a Tanzanian hip hop recording artist and record producer.  He is the founder and member of a Temeke group called Wanaume, an informal group of rappers from the temeke side of Dar es Salaam. In his last album, "Bongo Flava: Swahili Rap from Tanzania", many of the lyrics which are in his tracks include current problems within his country.  Some problems he raps about include, "HIV/AIDS, the difficulty of meeting basic needs, class and wealth barriers, and holding your head high despite everything".  One of Nature's well renowned songs is "Umoja wa Tanzania" which talks about a celebration within Tanzania and the sense of unity that it has exemplified.  “Utajijua” (“i don't care or rather is none of my business") from Juma Nature's brand new album Ubinadam Kazi, is a song about people who like to poke their noses into others’ business.

Discography 
Nini Chanzo (2001)
Ugali (2003)
Ubinadamu-Kazi (2005)
Zote History (2006)
Tugawane Umaskini (2009)

Awards 
2007 Channel O Music Video Awards - Best African East

Nominated 
2005 Tanzania Music Awards - Best Hip Hop Album ("Ubinadamu Kazi")
2007 MTV Europe Music Awards - Best African Act;;

References

External links
African Hip Hop
Afro Pop
MTV Base Africa profile: Juma Nature
Swahili Remix
Bongo Flava

1980 births
Living people
Tanzanian rappers
21st-century Tanzanian male singers
Tanzanian Bongo Flava musicians